Aleksandr Sidorenko may refer to:
 Aleksandr Sidorenko (wrestler) (born 1972), Belarusian wrestler
 Alexandre Sidorenko (born 1988), French tennis player
 Oleksandr Sydorenko (1960–2022), Ukrainian swimmer